O&O Defrag is a Windows defragmentation utility sold by German software developer O&O Software. It has won several awards by PC journals and magazines, and is certified by Microsoft for all its current NTFS-based operating systems, including Windows 2000, Server 2003, Vista, 7,  and 10.

Features 
 When required, the program checks the volume for errors before defragmenting.
 The defrag procedure can be scheduled for a certain time, or can be carried out when the PC is normally idle.
 The defrag can be run in the background so that the user hardly notices its operation.
 The defrag can be run in screensaver mode.
 Zone filing: categorize different files into different zones according to their levels of use and apply different methods to files in respective zones (a feature introduced in version 12).

There are five different defrag methods: Stealth, Space, Complete/Name, Complete/Modified, Complete/Access. "Stealth" is designed for use on PCs with large files and little free space, while the "Space" method is designed for heavily fragmented drives. The three "Complete" methods (Name, Modified and Access) sort the files on your drives alphabetically, according to date last changed, and according to date last accessed.

See also 
 Comparison of defragmentation software
 File system fragmentation
 List of defragmentation software

References

Further reading

External links 
 

Defragmentation software
Utilities for Windows

Windows-only shareware